Lidia Zamkow (1918–1982) was a Polish theatre actress and director.

Biography 

Lidia Zamkow was born on 19 June or 15 July (sources vary), 1918 in Rostov-on-Don. Until 1939 she was studying at the National Institute of Theatre Arts in Warsaw, and after World War II at the State Academy of Drama in Łódź (now Aleksander Zelwerowicz State Theatre Academy).

In 1944 she made her own actress' debut in the role of Isia in the Stanisław Wyspiański's Wedding on Polish Army Theatre in Lublin. In 1948 in Łódź she directed her first spectacle,  Bolesław Prus' Omyłka. In the years of 1950–1952, 1957–1958 and the 1964–1972 she was an actress and director of Juliusz Słowacki Theatre in Kraków. During the years of 1953–1954 Zamkow was an artistic director of Teatr Wybrzeże in Gdańsk. Then she was an actor and director of the Polish Army Theatre (now Teatr Dramatyczny) in Warsaw (1954–1957) and the Old Theatre in Kraków where she directed under pseudonym Słomczyńska (1958–1964). During the years of 1972–1974 she was a director of Teatr Studio in Warsaw. In later years Zamkow collaborated with many theatres in Poland and directed spectacles for Teatr TV. In the years of 1950–1953 she was a lecturer of the State Academy of Drama in Łódź.

Zamkow died on 19 June 1982 in Warsaw.

Notable works

References

External links 
 

1918 births
1982 deaths
Polish stage actresses
Polish theatre directors
Recipients of the State Award Badge (Poland)
Soviet emigrants to Poland
Recipient of the Meritorious Activist of Culture badge